Muncaster is a civil parish in Cumbria, North West England. 

Muncaster may also refer to:

Baron Muncaster, a now extinct title, held by the family who lived at Muncaster Castle, in Muncaster
Ben Muncaster, Scottish rugby player
Harriet Muncaster, English writer and illustrator
Joseph Dean Muncaster, Canadian businessman
Muncaster Mountain, a peak in the state of Washington, US